The 21st Guldbagge Awards ceremony, presented by the Swedish Film Institute, honored the best Swedish films of 1985, and took place on 27 January 1986. My Life as a Dog directed by Lasse Hallström was presented with the award for Best Film.

Awards
 Best Film: My Life as a Dog by Lasse Hallström
 Best Director: Hans Alfredson for False as Water
 Best Actor: Anton Glanzelius for My Life as a Dog
 Best Actress: Malin Ek for False as Water
 The Ingmar Bergman Award: Kerstin Eriksdotter

References

External links
Official website
Guldbaggen on Facebook
Guldbaggen on Twitter
21st Guldbagge Awards at Internet Movie Database

1986 in Sweden
1985 film awards
Guldbagge Awards ceremonies
1980s in Stockholm
January 1986 events in Europe